"Dear Matafele Peinem" is a poem by the Marshallese poet Kathy Jetn̄il-Kijiner. Written in English, the poem is a letter to her then seven month old daughter, Matafele Peinem. The poem is most notable for its having been read aloud by Jetn̄il-Kijiner at the opening ceremony of the 2014 UN Climate Summit, held at the United Nations headquarters in New York in September 2014; it received a standing ovation from the gathered delegates which lasted over one minute.

The poem's content primarily deals with the global climate crisis which, via rising sea levels, threatens to inundate the Marshall Islands. In the poem, Jetn̄il-Kijiner promises that she will protect her daughter from the crisis, and assures her, and her descendants, the ability to live in the Marshall Islands. The poem, however, also recognizes the failure to avoid the relocation of the Carteret Islanders, and promises that "We are drawing the line here".

Commenting on the poem in his retrospective documentary The Last Years of Majuro, in regards to the predicted inundation of the Marshall Islands due to climate change, Sam Denby said, "In stories, the underdog is supposed to win. When they give it their all, [...] when they read 'Dear Matafele Peinem', when they chant 1.5 to stay alive, it’s supposed to work. Today, projections show that under the best case scenario, we’ll reach 1.5 in 2052."


External links 

 Performance of the poem at the United Nations (YouTube video). United Nations.

Footnotes

Notes

References 

Marshallese art
United Nations climate change conferences
Climate change mass media
Environmental literature